Kwon Yong-kwan (born November 19, 1976) is a former South Korean professional baseball infielder who lastly played for the Hanwha Eagles of the KBO League.

References

External links
Career statistics and player information at the KBO League

1976 births
Living people
Baseball players from Seoul
KBO League infielders
South Korean baseball players
Hanwha Eagles players
LG Twins players
SSG Landers players